John Bartholomew  is an American politician who has served in the Vermont House of Representatives since 2011. He is a retired veterinarian.

References

Living people
21st-century American politicians
Democratic Party members of the Vermont House of Representatives
University of Oklahoma alumni
Oklahoma State University alumni
Year of birth missing (living people)